Guardians of the 'Hood is an arcade video game released by Atari Games in June 1992. It is a side-scrolling beat 'em up featuring digitized sprites, similar to Pit-Fighter, and sprite scaling effects that gives a feeling of depth. The game was originally sold in both dedicated cabinets and conversion kits and it allows a maximum of three simultaneous players.

Plot and gameplay
Taking on the role of either Conner, Chief, Javier, or Tanya, the player must advance through four areas of the city (slums, subway, Chinatown and amusement park) to defeat gangs such as The Dreads, The Shavers, and The Dragons. After defeating a gang leader, he will join the player's team to help on the streets. After cleaning up an area, the player returns to the Gym to have a head-to-head match against a friend. After winning two of three rounds, the player proceeds to the next area. The last stage is a fight with Mr. Big (actually female).

The game features a weapon system, where a player can collect a variety of objects along the way and throw or use them on the enemies. There is also a power move called "Magic" similar to those seen in the Street Fighter series, where the player throws a projectile at the enemy.

Reception 
RePlay reported Guardians of the 'Hood to be the twelfth most-popular arcade game at the time. It had had a mixed reception. Hardcore Gaming 101 said that it improves on Pit Fighter's formula but manages to be "to be terrible in almost every way."

References

External links
 Guardians of the 'Hood on Arcade History
 
 

1992 video games
Arcade video games
Arcade-only video games
Atari arcade games
Cooperative video games
Head-to-head arcade video games
Martial arts video games
Obscenity controversies in video games
Organized crime video games
Side-scrolling beat 'em ups
Video games developed in the United States
Video games featuring female protagonists
Video games scored by Brad Fuller
Video games with 2.5D graphics
Video games with digitized sprites